The 2007 NCAA Bowling Championship was the fourth annual tournament to determine the national champion of women's NCAA collegiate ten-pin bowling. The tournament was played in Apopka, Florida during April 2007.

Vanderbilt defeated Maryland–Eastern Shore in the championship match, 4 games to 3, to win their first national title.

Qualification
Since there is only one national collegiate championship for women's bowling, all NCAA bowling programs (whether from Division I, Division II, or Division III) were eligible. A total of 8 teams were invited to contest this championship, which consisted of a modified double-elimination style tournament.

Tournament bracket 
Site: Apopka, Florida

All-tournament team
Josie Earnest, Vanderbilt
Kristi Kerr, Fairleigh Dickinson
Kaitlin Reynolds, Vanderbilt
Marion Singleton, UMES
Jessica Worsley, UMES

References

NCAA Bowling Championship
NCAA Bowling Championship
2007 in bowling
2007 in sports in Florida
April 2007 sports events in the United States